{{Infobox settlement
| name                   =  
| image_skyline          = 9637Hagonoy Roads Church School Park Landmarks Bulacan 26.jpg
| image_caption          = Municipal Hall
| image_seal             = Hagonoy Bulacan.png
| seal_size              = 100x80px
| image_map              = 
| map_caption            = 
| image_map1             = 
| pushpin_map            = Philippines
| pushpin_label_position = left
| pushpin_map_caption    = Location within the 
| coordinates            = 
| settlement_type        = 
| subdivision_type       = Country
| subdivision_name       = Philippines
| subdivision_type1      = Region
| subdivision_name1      = 
| subdivision_type2      = Province
| subdivision_name2      = 
| official_name          = 
| etymology              = 
| named_for              = 
| native_name            =
| other_name             =
| nicknames              = | motto                  = Ahon, Hagonoy!  (Ascend, Hagonoy!) 
| anthem                 =
| subdivision_type3      = District
| subdivision_name3      = 
| established_title      = Founded
| established_date       = July 26, 1581
| parts_type             = Barangays
| parts_style            = para
| p1                     =   (see Barangays)
| leader_title           =  
| leader_name            = Flordeliza C. Manlapaz 
| leader_title1          = Vice Mayor
| leader_name1           = Ma. Rosario S. Mendoza 
| leader_title2          = Representative 
| leader_name2           = Danilo A. Domingo
| leader_title3          = Municipal Council
| leader_name3           = 
| leader_title4          = Electorate 
| leader_name4           =  voters
| government_type        = 
| government_footnotes   = 
| elevation_m            = 
| elevation_max_m        = 43
| elevation_min_m        = -4
| elevation_max_rank     =
| elevation_min_rank     =
| elevation_footnotes    = 
| elevation_max_footnotes= 
| elevation_min_footnotes=
| area_rank              = 
| area_footnotes         = 
| area_total_km2         = 
| population_footnotes   = 
| population_total       = 
| population_as_of       = 
| population_density_km2 = auto
| population_blank1_title= Households
| population_blank1      =  
| population_blank2_title= 
| population_blank2      = 
| population_demonym     = Hagonoeño
| population_rank        =
| population_note        =
| timezone               = PST
| utc_offset             = +8
| postal_code_type       = ZIP code
| postal_code            = 
| postal2_code_type      = 
| postal2_code           = 
| area_code_type         = 
| area_code              = 
| website                = 
| demographics_type1     = Economy
| demographics1_title1   = 
| demographics1_info1    = 
| demographics1_title2   = Poverty incidence
| demographics1_info2    = %
| demographics1_title3   = Revenue
| demographics1_info3    =   
| demographics1_title4   = Revenue rank
| demographics1_info4    = 
| demographics1_title5   = Assets
| demographics1_info5    =   
| demographics1_title6   = Assets rank
| demographics1_info6    = 
| demographics1_title7   = IRA
| demographics1_info7    =  
| demographics1_title8   = IRA rank
| demographics1_info8    = 
| demographics1_title9   = Expenditure
| demographics1_info9    =   
| demographics1_title10  = Liabilities
| demographics1_info10   =  
| demographics_type2     = Utilties
| demographics2_title1   = Electricity
| demographics2_info1    = Meralco 
| demographics2_title2   = Water
| demographics2_info2    =  
| demographics2_title3   = Telecommunications
| demographics2_info3    = 
| demographics2_title4   = Cable TV
| demographics2_info4    =
| demographics2_title5   = 
| demographics2_info5    =
| demographics2_title6   = 
| demographics2_info6    =
| demographics2_title7   = 
| demographics2_info7    =
| demographics2_title8   = 
| demographics2_info8    =
| demographics2_title9   = 
| demographics2_info9    =
| demographics2_title10  = 
| demographics2_info10   =
| blank_name_sec1        = 
| blank_info_sec1        = 
| blank1_name_sec1       = Native languages
| blank1_info_sec1       = 
| blank2_name_sec1       = Crime index
| blank2_info_sec1       = 
| blank3_name_sec1       = 
| blank3_info_sec1       = 
| blank4_name_sec1       = 
| blank4_info_sec1       = 
| blank5_name_sec1       = 
| blank5_info_sec1       = 
| blank6_name_sec1       = 
| blank6_info_sec1       = 
| blank7_name_sec1       = 
| blank7_info_sec1       = 
| blank1_name_sec2       = Major religions
| blank1_info_sec2       = 
| blank2_name_sec2       = Feast date
| blank2_info_sec2       = 
| blank3_name_sec2       = Catholic diocese
| blank3_info_sec2       =
| blank4_name_sec2       = Patron saint 
| blank4_info_sec2       = 
| blank5_name_sec2       = 
| blank5_info_sec2       = 
| blank6_name_sec2       = 
| blank6_info_sec2       = 
| blank7_name_sec2       = 
| blank7_info_sec2       =
| short_description      =
| footnotes              =
}}

Hagonoy, officially the Municipality of Hagonoy, is a 1st class municipality in the province of Bulacan, Philippines. According to the 2020 census, it has a population of 133,448 people.

History
Hagonoy was first mentioned in the history of the Philippines in 1571. Even before the "blood compact" between the Spain's conqueror Miguel Lopez de Legazpi and the Philippines' Datu Sikatuna was made, the place was already known as Hagonoy. The land consists of archipelagic marsh and river tributaries going to the sea, where the first ancestors of this town probably took this way to reach Hagonoy.

Hagonoy first appeared in Philippine history when they formed part of the fleet of Tarik Sulayman of Macabebe, Pampanga that met Martin de Goiti at the Battle of Bangkusay in the initial defense of the Lusong against the Spaniards in 1571.

In the beginning, Hagonoy was part of Alcaldia de Calumpit as its visita together with Apalit. It has huge convent having founded on April 22, 1581, with Fray Diego Ordonez de Vivar as its first minister according to Gaspar's "Conquistas delas Islas" Book 2 (Fray Diego having credited for the christiniazation of Calumpit, Malolos and Bulakan). At first, it was also included in the territorial part of Encomienda de Calumpit that was given by Governor General Gonzalo Ronquillo to Sargento Juan de Moron for his good service and loyalty to Spanish Crown. Sargento Juan Moron once trusted his land to the Augustinian friars, and that's how it was handed to Fray Diego Vivar. It is also noted that on the primary sources documents such as Miguel de Loarca's "Relacion delas Islas" written in 1582 and Luis Perez de Dasmarinas report on King of Spain in June 1591 didn't mention Hagonoy as an independent encomienda or town, instead it is simultaneously with the much older town of Calumpit and it was officially established as a civil town in May 1671. According to records and old folks, there were already inhabitants in some places of this settlement.These places were Tibaguin and Pugad, coastal barrios sharing the coastline with the City of Malolos and towns of Bulakan, Obando and the City of Manila.

Magat Salamat, a revolutionary hero, and the last Prince of the Kingdom of Tondo, once headed this town. He was the ancestor of the Salamat families now living in different barrios of this town.

Origin of the name
The town was named after the "hagunoy" (Chromolaena odorata), a medicinal plant that used to be abundant in its river banks and along the seashores. The original populace used its leaves as their herbal remedy of choice for common illnesses and as food ingredients. Because of the medicinal value of the plant, the news of its effectiveness spread leading the people to call the place "Hagonoy".

Hagonoy's town legend
In the 16th century, some friars took a boat from Manila to the province of Bulacan and reached what was then called "Quinabaloan" (from Kapampangan word kinabaluan meaning "had been known" or "pinag-alaman" in Tagalog—which was then still part of the town of Calumpit and is now the barangays of Santa Monica and San Jose). At that time, a very charming lass was so popular among the young men of the locality. She had many suitors and admirers. One day, she felt ill and she needed someone to get leaves of the hagonoy plant by the river (which is now called Sapang Pari because the friars and priests used this river to commute).

A man offered to promptly get some leaves of the plant and in deep gratitude, she promised to marry him. As he was gathering the leaves of the hagunoy plant for his dearly beloved, the group of friars in a passing boat stopped to ask him, "Quien vive?" (Where are we?). The man did not understand Spanish and was extremely intimidated by the guardia civil (Spanish civil guard) that escorted the friars. Thinking that they were asking what he was grasping in his hands, he quickly retorted "Hagunoy po!" (Hagunoy, sir!) and scampered away.

These were the first Augustinian friars that got into town and they noted the place's name as "Hagonoy". Hence, the origin of the illustrious town's name.

Geography
With a total land area of 103.10 square kilometers, Hagonoy is situated at the south-west corner of the province of Bulacan. It is bounded by the municipality of Calumpit on the north, municipality of Paombong on the east, municipality of Masantol, Pampanga on the west and Manila Bay on the south. The municipality is approximately 54 kilometers from Metro Manila or about an hour and a half drive. It can be accessed via North Luzon Expressway and MacArthur Highway.

Hagonoy is a long ridge with a lake on its edge by Manila Bay called "Wawa", which is now part of Barangays San Sebastian and San Nicolas. It is basically a fishing town with Manila Bay as its proximate fishing ground, which extends up to the provinces of Pampanga, Bataan, and Cavite. Its more adventurous fisherfolk brave the waves of the South China Sea northward and cross into the Philippine Sea in the Pacific Ocean on the eastern seaboard where they cast their nets and haul their catch to the fishing ports of Quezon province.

Barangays

Hagonoy is politically subdivided into 26 barangays grouped into 5 clusters or kumpol for statistical purposes. All barangays are classified by the Philippine Statistics Authority as urban.

Some of the barangays in Hagonoy had a different name than it does now. Their names comes from events, legends, things and the condition of the place. Here is a list of them:

 Sagrada Familia - Malayak
 San Agustin - Bantayan
 San Juan - Burayag
 San Nicolas - Bangos
 San Pascual - Dita
 San Roque - Bagong Baryo
 San Sebastian - Wawa
 Santa Elena - Marulaw
 Santo Rosario - Tangos

Climate

Demographics

Economy

Hagonoy is mainly a fishing municipality with 7,837.65 hectares devoted to fish farming or about three-fourths of its total land area. It is home to about 1,423 fishpond operators and 55 registered consignacions – a venue for trading aquaculture products. The town offers a variety of harvests which includes prawns, shrimps, milkfish, tilapia, crabs, mussels and oysters.

With its abundant water resources and the coastal nature of the town, the majority of the population is dependent on the fishing industry. Even the municipal government has its own fishpond locally known as "Propyus", situated in Pugad and Tibaguin, two coastal barangays of Hagonoy along the coast of Manila Bay. It is subdivided to 7 lots with a combined lot area of 412 hectares of municipal waters.

Two local fish ports called "pundohan" – one in barrio San Nicolas and the other at the Poblacion, are the busiest commercial areas in the town. Fish traders from Lucena and Dagupan among other merchants of other provinces are regular bulk buyers the local ports or at the private "consignacions" (brokerage) of the large milkfish growers.

The coastal barrios are virtually 24/7 as fishermen go out to the sea at night for hours or even days while their loving families and relatives await them. Upon their return, their catch is immediately sorted out and sold at the local public markets and "talipapa" of the barangays. Their catch are also transported to the public markets in nearby towns and up to the public/private markets and supermarkets in Metro Manila.

Barangay Santo Niño adjacent to the Poblacion is host to the numerous brokers of prawns for the domestic and export markets. The boats that sell their prawn catch at these brokers at times come from as far as the province of Capiz. A processing plant very near the brokers prepares and packages the prawns to export quality and global standards.

There are 2 “talipapa” (flea markets) in Hagonoy that also played minor central business districts – Santo Rosario and San Agustin. Business activities include wet and dry markets, grocery stores, carinderia, and computer shops.

According to the Commission on Audit (COA) 2010 Annual Financial Report, Hagonoy ranked as the 8th richest municipality in Bulacan, surpassing the annual income of other 1st class municipalities like Bocaue, Calumpit, Plaridel, San Ildefonso and Balagtas.

Trade and commerce
Trade and commerce in Hagonoy is concentrated at the town center where the public market, municipal hall, church, schools, hospital, clinics, and commercial spaces are situated. Major business activities include drugstores, banks, financial institutions, private consignacions, restaurants/food shops, groceries, and construction supplies.

Puregold Hagonoy - a hypermarket operated by Puregold Price Club, Inc., opened on October 24, 2012. It is located at Barangay Santo Niño (Poblacion).

Super 8 Grocery Warehouse Hagonoy

Communication
Philippine Long Distance Telephone Company (PLDT) and Digital Telecommunications Philippines, Inc. (DIGITEL) are the main landline telephone service provider in Hagonoy with 2,134 and 1,700 subscribers respectively.

Many residents have subscribed to wireless phone services such as Globe, Smart, Talk 'N Text, TM (Touch Mobile), Sun Cellular and DITO. As per the Municipal Engineers Office record, there are 10 cell sites installed in strategic locations in Hagonoy to improve the signal coverage and reception.

On the other hand, telegraph and express mail services are being provided by the local post office and private companies such as LBC and RCPI-Western Union.

Government

Elected officials
The following officials were elected in the Philippine Elections on May 9, 2022, to serve a three-year term.
Mayor: Flordeliza "Baby" C. Manlapaz (PDP-Laban)
Vice Mayor: Ma. Rosario "Charo" S. Mendoza (PDP-Laban)

Councilors
Ma. Cristina "Tina" G. Perez (PDP-Laban)
Raulito "Jey-R" C. Manlapaz Jr. (PDP-Laban)
Millord S. Cruz (PDP-Laban)
Elmer S. Santos (PDP-Laban)
Dalisay "Baby" V. Ople (NUP)
Christopher "Chris" R. Baluyot (NUP)
Michael Darwin M. Cruz (PDP-Laban)
Lamberto "Amber" T. Villanueva (PDP-Laban)

List of chief executives
Angel L. Cruz Jr. (2007 - 2013)
Felix V. Ople (1998 - 2007)
Wilhelmino Sy-Alvarado (1987 - 1998)
Hermogenes B. Perez (1972 - 1986)
Don Francisco L. Sebastian (First Mayor)

Religion
National Shrine and Parish of St. Anne in the Philippines

Hagonoy is deeply religious, in the town centre is the native's principal Church. The National Shrine of Saint Anne was originally a visita under the parish of Calumpit. It became a town church in 1731 with Fr. Juan Albarran, OSA, as its first curate. It was rebuilt in 1871 by Fr. Ignacio Manzanares, OSA. The church was taken over by the Filipino clergy in 1896 with Fr. Clemente Garcia as the first Filipino curate. He was succeeded by Dr. Mariano Sevilla from 1902 to 1922, Fr. Exequiel Morales, 1922–1936. Fr. Celestino Rodriguez OFM, curate since 1936 and improved the church. It was made into a national shrine to honor St. Anne, the mother of the Blessed Virgin Mary. This church holds the relics of St. Anne from the Basilica of Sainte-Anne-de-Beaupré, the international shrine in Quebec, Canada and also the relics of St. Joachim, the husband of St. Anne.

It is composed of the sub-parish churches of San Agustin, San Jose, Santa Monica, San Nicolas, Santo Niño, San Sebastian, and Sitio Parong-Parong of Barangay San Agustin.

St. John the Baptist Parish Church

Situated in Barangay San Juan, and is composed by the barangays of San Juan, Tampok, San Isidro, and San Miguel. Inaugurated on March 23, 1948, through Bishop Miguel O'Doherty of Archdiocese of Manila. Fr. Elias Reyes served as its first curate. The church was step by step reconstructed in the curation of Fr. Jose Ingco, Fr. Serafin Riedo de Dios, Fr. Antonio Borlongan, and Fr. Generoso Jimenez with the cooperation of Bishop Rufino J. Santos and the good people of the community.

St. Helena Parish Church

The church became a parish on January 11, 1941, under the curation of its first curator Rev. Fr. Melchor A. Barcelona. It is composed of the sub-parish churches of Sagrada Familia, Sitio Buga, Sitio Tangos, Pugad and Tibaguin.

Saint Anthony of Padua Parish Church

The church is situated at Barangay Iba, Hagonoy, Bulacan. It is composed of the sub-parish churches of Carillo, Iba-Ibayo, and Palapat in Hagonoy, and Iba O'Este and Iba Este in the town of Calumpit up North.

Our Lady of Perpetual Help Parish Church

The church is situated at Barangay San Pedro, Hagonoy, Bulacan. It is composed of the sub-parish churches of Abulalas and San Pablo in Hagonoy, and San Isidro II in the town of Paombong.

Our Lady of the Most Holy Rosary Parish Church

The church is situated at Barangay Santo Rosario, Hagonoy, Bulacan. It is composed of the sub-parish churches of Mercado, Santa Cruz, San Pascual, and San Roque.

Culture
Annual fiestas are held to honor the town's and each barangays patron saints. The town's patron saint is St. Anne (the mother of the Blessed Virgin Mary) or fondly called "Apo Ana" in the vernacular by the natives. She is enshrined at the church named after her in the poblacion. This church is a National Shrine. There are also small fiestas among the different puroks of the barangays, there are feasts for the: Sacred Heart of Jesus, Our Lady of the Rosary, and other commemorative feasts of the Catholic Church. The Holy Week observance includes self flagellants on the road, zarzuelas, the "pabasa" (the passion sang as a psalm), the Good Friday and Easter dawn processions, in all parish churches. The Good Friday processions of the Parishes like the Poblacion and the Santo Rosario parishes are attended by at least 15 to 30 Lenten icons. The fiestas and Holy Week rituals are deemed as a sacred tradition. Some barangays hold their feasts with extraordinary roadside decorations and buntings so elaborate that the road is almost covered with overhead decor sufficient to screen-off the sunlight at noontime.

Major Fiestas in Hagonoy such as the Santo Niño Fiesta, Santa Elena Fiesta, & the Town’s Fiesta & Foundation Day are some of the major festivities in town.

Palaisdaan Festival/Desposorio Festival
On July 24, 2015 the municipality formally introduce the Palaisdaan Festival (or Pangisdaan Festival) nationwide through the morning show Umagang Kay Ganda of ABS-CBN Channel 2. Aside from showcasing the main livelihood of the town, the festival also offers a variety of cultural and religious events which the town of Hagonoy is known for. It is a month-long celebration in honor of the town's patroness, Saint Anne, and the founding anniversary of Hagonoy as a pueblo way back 1581. The celebration usually starts when the image of St. Anne visits places around Hagonoy or even outside the town. The processional image is then brought back to the shrine to formally open the festivity for the 9-days novena, followed by the fluvial parade or pagoda in the river systems of Hagonoy. Indak-kalye or street dancing is also one of the highlights of the festival, where the traditional Desposorio is danced to the tune of Lerion hymn. Other activities before the fiesta include entertainment and cultural programs, games or laro ng lahi, religious activities like baptism and confirmation. The Visperas Mayores or the day before the fiesta is also a highlight, this is when the battle of marching bands happens.

On September 15, 2019, Iba National High School Dance Troupe, one of the pioneering school folk dancing group in Hagonoy, together with Liping Hagonoeño and with the help of Hiyas ng Hagonoy, featured the Palaisdaan Festival in the province-wide Singkaban Festival. They won 2nd place and Best in Costume award.

Social services
Protective services
Hagonoy is generally a peaceful community. Peace and order is being maintained by the Philippine National Police – Hagonoy Station manned by 29 PNP personnel. The Hagonoy PNP is equipped by 24 long firearms and 17 short firearms, with 2 patrol cars and 4 motorcycles as service vehicles.

In 2009, there were 113 reported crime incidence in the municipality. The crime solution efficiency rate is registered at 97.26%.

Health and nutrition
There are 3 hospitals operating in Hagonoy – 2 private hospitals and a government-controlled district hospital. The Emilio Perez Memorial District Hospital, situated at Barangay Santo Nino, is a 50-bed capacity hospital that offers secondary healthcare services. It is one of the district hospitals owned and controlled by the Provincial Government of Bulacan. Immediately beside it is the Mateo-Mabborang General Hospital, a private hospital which was opened on October 9, 2010. The Divine Word Hospital is a private hospital situated at Barangay San Pedro also offers secondary healthcare services.

These hospitals are being complemented by the Amado Aldaba Memorial Health Center, the main rural health unit (RHU) being operated by the municipal government. It offers primary healthcare services which also includes laboratory and dental services. Aside of this, 3 other rural health units in barangays San Juan, San Nicolas and Santo Rosario are also under the local government, headed by the municipal officer in RHU-Aldaba, and 3 other physicians are servicing the other RHUs.

The municipality also operates two (2) physical therapy and rehabilitation centers. The first is located at the municipal compound while the other is situated at Barangay Santa Monica.

The medical personnel of the municipal government is composed of 4 Rural Health Physicians, 4 public nurses, 26 midwives, 2 sanitary inspectors, 1 medical technologist and 2 dentists. These are aided by the 172 Barangay Health Workers at the barangay level.

On the other hand, nutrition program is being implemented by the Municipal Nutrition Office. At the barangay, they are assisted by the 29 Lingkod Lingap sa Nayon (LLNs) supported by 189 Mother Leaders. As of 2008, there were 35 identified very low and 565 low nutritional status in Hagonoy.

Transportation

In Hagonoy, the primary and most dominant mode of transportation is tricycle because of its narrow roads. In 2011, there are 4,671 registered members of Tricycle Operators and Drivers Association (TODA) in Hagonoy servicing all barangays except Pugad and Tibaguin. Both of those barangays are being served by passenger boats.

Other modes of transportation are jeepneys and buses. There are about 565 registered jeepneys in Hagonoy divided into 3 routes – Malolos Bayan, BSU-Malolos Crossing, and Hagonoy-Calumpit. There is also a jeepney route from the poblacion going to Robinsons Place Malolos and back. Passenger buses transport passengers in Hagonoy to and from Divisoria, Monumento, Cubao and Pasay in Metro Manila via the 2 bus companies that are presently operating in Hagonoy. The Baliwag Transit having 32 buses leaving Hagonoy every 30 minutes and the First North Luzon Transit with 11 buses leaving every 45 minutes.
Baliwag Transit
First North Luzon Transit
Jeepneys (going to Paombong, Malolos Bayan, BSU, Malolos Crossing, Robinsons Place Malolos and Calumpit)
Tricycles (most common mean of tranpostation locally)Hanging and wooden bridgesThe four hanging bridges which are now in state of disrepair are located in barangays Iba, Abulalas, Carillo and San Agustin. Barangay Abulalas' hanging bridge links it to Barangay San Isidro II in Paombong town. The bridge is about 200 meters long as it crossed the downstream of the Labangan Channel. In Barangay Carillo, residents said the hanging bridge in their village linking Barangay Abulalas was totally damaged just before the 2007 elections. Its steel cable snapped while supporters of a mayoralty candidate were crossing in April 2007. In Barangay San Agustin, residents are trying to protect what remains of their hanging bridge that links with Barangay San Pablo.

Power and water supply
The power requirement of the entire municipality is supplied by the Manila Electric Company (Meralco) including the coastal barangays of Pugad and Tibaguin. While the Hagonoy Water District provides the water requirement of Hagonoy. It supplies the daily water use of all 26 barangays using their 24 barangay pump stations.

Cemeteries
Hagonoy Public Cemetery
Hagonoy Catholic Cemetery
Hagonoy Memorial Park
Peralta Cemetery (San Sebastian)
Santo Rosario Catholic Cemetery
Santa Elena Catholic Cemetery
San Juan Cemetery
Iba Cemetery
Cherubim of Heaven Memorial Park (San Pedro)

Education
The educational institutions in Hagonoy is composed of: 29 public elementary schools, 10 private elementary schools, 4 public secondary schools, 4 private schools, 26 Day Care Centers, 1 Technical/Vocational School and 1 satellite campus of a state university.

In School Year 2008–2009, the combined elementary school enrollment is 17,934, where 9 out of the 10 students are enrolled in public elementary school. On the other hand, secondary school enrolment is registered at 10,477 students, of which 78.45% are enrolled in public high school.

Every barangay has a Day Care Center with an assigned Day Care Worker. The total number of children enrolled is 1,315 in School Year 2008–2009, composed of 629 boys and 686 girls.

Tertiary/Technical schools
The Bulacan State University - Hagonoy Campus is a satellite university of Bulacan State University situated at Barangay Iba-Ibayo officially opened on June 7, 2011. The fourth satellite campus of BulSU offers courses on Criminology, Education, Engineering, Information Technology, Industrial Technology, Hospitality Management and Tourism Management.

Public schoolsCollegeBulacan State University-Hagonoy Campus (Iba and Carillo)High schoolsIba National High School
Mayor Ramona S. Trillana National High School
Santa Monica National High School
San Pedro National High School
Don Miguel High SchoolElementary schoolsPrivate schoolsHigh schoolsGodwin's Montessori School
Saint Anne's Catholic School (formerly known as Saint Anne's Catholic High School)
Saint Mary's Academy of Hagonoy (or SMA, formerly known as Saint Anne's Academy)
Mother of Perpetual Help School (offering Junior High School only)Elementary schoolsGodwin's Montessori School
Hagonoy Ecumenical School
Holy Child School of Hagonoy
Jesus is Lord Christian School
Saint Mary's Academy of Hagonoy
Santiago Trillana Academy
School of Wisdom for Ideal Children
St. Anne's Catholic School
Mother of Perpetual Help School
Victoria-Vazquez Christian SchoolPre-School'''
Kid's Lane Learning Center
Mother of Perpetual Help School

Notable personalities
Pedro Bantigue y Natividad - a Priest and Bishop who served as Auxiliary Bishop of the Archdiocese of Manila and first Bishop of the Diocese of San Pablo, Laguna.
Blas F. Ople - a journalist and politician having served several high-ranking positions in the executive and legislative branch of the Philippine government including Senate President, Secretary of Foreign Affairs and Minister of Labor.
Pablo S. Trillana III - a historian and Knight Grand Cross of Rizal, who served as chairman of the National Historical Institute from 1999 to April 2002.
Wilhelmino Sy-Alvarado - former vice governor of Bulacan (2019-2022 and previously served from 2007-2010) and governor of Bulacan (2010-2019), and mayor of Hagonoy (1986-1998)

Gallery

References

External links

 [ Philippine Standard Geographic Code]
Hagonoy Bulacan
 Hagonoy Bulacan Website 
 Philippine Census Information
 2010 Philippine Census Information
 Population of capital cities and cities of 100,000 and more inhabitants United Nations Statistics Division, accessed 24 August 2006

Municipalities of Bulacan
Populated places on Manila Bay
Populated places on the Pampanga River